Providence Township, North Carolina may refer to one of the following places:

Providence Township, Pasquotank County, North Carolina
Providence Township, Randolph County, North Carolina
Providence Township, Rowan County, North Carolina

See also
Providence, North Carolina (disambiguation)
Providence Township (disambiguation)

North Carolina township disambiguation pages